Joseph Colón (born February 18, 1990) is a Puerto Rican former professional baseball pitcher. He has played in Major League Baseball (MLB) for the Cleveland Indians.

Career

Cleveland Indians
After graduating from the Puerto Rico Baseball Academy and High School, the Indians selected Colón in the 12th round of the 2009 MLB draft. He missed the 2010 season due to injury. He spent the next three seasons pitching for the Lake County Captains of the Class A Midwest League and the Carolina Mudcats of the Class A-Advanced Carolina League. He reached the Akron RubberDucks of the Class AA Eastern League in 2014.

In 2015, the Indians converted Colón from a starting pitcher into a relief pitcher. He spent the 2015 season with Akron and the Columbus Clippers of the Class AAA International League. A minor league free agent after the 2015 season, the Indians resigned Colón with a non-roster invitation to spring training in 2016. That offseason, Minor League Baseball announced Colón failed a test for a "drug of abuse" for the second time, and would be suspended for the first 50 games of the 2016 season.

The Indians purchased Colón's contract and added him to the 40-man roster on July 2, 2016. The Indians promoted Colón to the major leagues on July 7. 

On July 1, 2017, Colón was suspended for the remainder of the 2017 season after testing positive for a banned substance. The Indians designated Colón for assignment on October 2, 2017, and outrighted him to the Triple-A Columbus Clippers on October 6, 2017. He elected free agency on November 6, 2017.

St. Louis Cardinals
On February 19, 2018, Colón signed a minor league deal with the St. Louis Cardinals.  He was released on March 28, 2018.

Bravos de León
On June 22, 2018, Colón signed with the Bravos de León of the Mexican League. He became a free agent after the season.

See also
 List of Major League Baseball players from Puerto Rico
 List of Major League Baseball players suspended for performance-enhancing drugs

References

External links

1990 births
Living people
Akron RubberDucks players
Arizona League Indians players
Baseball players suspended for drug offenses
Bravos de León players
Carolina Mudcats players
Charros de Jalisco players
Cleveland Indians players
Cangrejeros de Santurce (baseball) players
Columbus Clippers players
Gigantes de Carolina players
Lake County Captains players
Leones de Ponce players
Liga de Béisbol Profesional Roberto Clemente pitchers
Major League Baseball pitchers
Major League Baseball players from Puerto Rico
Mahoning Valley Scrappers players
Mexican League baseball pitchers
People from Caguas, Puerto Rico
Puerto Rican expatriate baseball players in Mexico
Puerto Rican sportspeople in doping cases
2017 World Baseball Classic players